Wakerley and Barrowden railway station is a former railway station in Wakerley, Northamptonshire, England which also served the nearby village of Barrowden, Rutland. It was owned by the London and North Western Railway but from 1883 to 1916 was also served by trains of the Great Northern Railway.

It opened for passengers on 1 November 1879 along with Kingscliffe railway station and Nassington railway station, on a new section of line from Wansford Line Junction at Seaton to Yarwell Junction at Wansford.

Wakerley and Barrowden station closed for goods traffic on 28 December 1964 and to passengers on 6 June 1966, when the passenger service from Rugby (Midland) to Peterborough (East) was withdrawn. At the same time the section of line from Rugby (Midland) to Kingscliffe was closed completely.

References

Disused railway stations in Northamptonshire
Former London and North Western Railway stations
Railway stations in Great Britain opened in 1879
Railway stations in Great Britain closed in 1966
Beeching closures in England